Sicre is a surname. Notable people with the surname include:

Félix Sicre (1817–1871), Cuban chess master
Jorge L. Sicre-Gattorno (born 1958), Cuban-American painter
José Gómez-Sicre (1916–1991), Cuban lawyer, art critic and author
Juan José Sicre (1898–1974), Cuban sculptor